Eurya rengechiensis is a species of plant in the family Pentaphylacaceae. It is endemic to Taiwan and found only near Taichung. Eurya rengechiensis is an evergreen small tree.

References

rengechiensis
Endangered plants
Endemic flora of Taiwan
Trees of Taiwan
Taxonomy articles created by Polbot